Pareiorhaphis nudulus is a species of catfish in the family Loricariidae. It is native to South America, where it occurs in the drainage basins of the Araranguá River, the Mampituba River, the Maquiné River, and the Três Forquilhas River in the states of Santa Catarina and Rio Grande do Sul in Brazil. It is typically seen in small, shallow rivers with clear water, moderate to strong current, and rocky substrates. The species reaches 3.4 cm (1.3 inches) in standard length and is believed to be a facultative air-breather.

References 

Loricariidae
Fish described in 1999
Catfish of South America
Freshwater fish of Brazil